St. Teresa's Secondary School is a higher secondary school located at Diamond Harbour Road, Kidderpore, Kolkata, West Bengal. The school was established in 1885 and named in honor of Marie Thérèse Haze.  This school is affiliated to ICSE.

See also
Education in India
List of schools in India
Education in West Bengal

References

External links 
 

High schools and secondary schools in Kolkata
Educational institutions established in 1885
1885 establishments in India